Alexander Resch (born 5 April 1979 in Berchtesgaden, Bavaria) is a German luger who competed from 1998 to 2010. Together with Patric Leitner, he won the men's doubles event at the 2002 Winter Olympics in Salt Lake City, United States. They also competed at the 2006 Winter Olympics, finishing sixth. At their last race at the 2010 Winter Olympics in Vancouver, they won bronze.

In addition they won a dozen medals at the FIL World Luge Championships, including eight golds (Men's doubles:1999, 2000, 2004, 2007; Mixed team: 2001, 2003, 2004, 2007), two silvers (Men's doubles: 2005, Mixed team: 2000), and two bronzes (Men's doubles: 2003, Mixed team 1999). At the FIL European Luge Championships, they also won seven medals with five golds (Men's doubles: 2000, 2002, 2004, 2006; Mixed team: 2000), one silver (Mixed team: 2002), and one bronze (Men's doubles: 2008 (tied with Italy)).

They won the overall Luge World Cup men's doubles title six times (1999–2000, 2001-2, 2003-4, 2005-6, 2006-7, 2007-8).

References

 DatabaseOlympics.com information on Resch.
 
 Fuzilogik Sports – Winter Olympic results – Men's luge
 Hickoksports.com results on Olympic champions in luge and skeleton.
 Hickok sports information on World champions in luge and skeleton.
 List of men's doubles luge World Cup champions since 1978.

External links
 
 
 

1979 births
Living people
German male lugers
People from Berchtesgaden
Sportspeople from Upper Bavaria
Lugers at the 2002 Winter Olympics
Lugers at the 2006 Winter Olympics
Lugers at the 2010 Winter Olympics
Olympic gold medalists for Germany
Olympic bronze medalists for Germany
Olympic lugers of Germany
Olympic medalists in luge
Medalists at the 2010 Winter Olympics
Medalists at the 2002 Winter Olympics